Bozhou or Bo Prefecture was a zhou (prefecture) in imperial China, centering on modern Bozhou, Anhui, China. It existed (intermittently) from the 6th century until 1912.

The modern prefecture-level city Bozhou, created in 1986, retains its name.

Geography
The administrative region of Bo Prefecture in the Tang dynasty is in the border area of modern northern Anhui and southeastern Henan. It probably includes parts of modern: 
Under the administration of Bozhou, Anhui:
Bozhou
Mengcheng County
Under the administration of Shangqiu, Henan:
Yongcheng
Under the administration of Zhoukou, Henan:
Luyi County

Population
In the early 1100s during the Song dynasty, there were 130,119 households and 183,581 people.

See also
Qiao Commandery

References

 
 

Prefectures of Later Han (Five Dynasties)
Prefectures of the Tang dynasty
Prefectures of the Sui dynasty
Prefectures of Later Tang
Prefectures of Later Liang (Five Dynasties)
Prefectures of Later Jin (Five Dynasties)
Prefectures of the Song dynasty
Former prefectures in Henan
Former prefectures in Anhui
Prefectures of Later Zhou
Prefectures of the Jin dynasty (1115–1234)